"Rappaccini's Daughter" is a Gothic short story by Nathaniel Hawthorne first published in the December 1844 issue of The United States Magazine and Democratic Review in New York, and later in the 1846 collection Mosses from an Old Manse. It is about Giacomo Rappaccini, a medical researcher in Padua who grows a garden of poisonous plants. He brings up his daughter to tend the plants, and she becomes resistant to the poisons, but in the process she herself becomes poisonous to others. The traditional story of a poisonous maiden has been traced back to India, and Hawthorne's version has been adopted in contemporary works.

Plot summary
The story is set in Padua, Italy, in a distant and unspecified past, possibly in the sixteenth century, after the Paduan Botanical Garden had been founded.

Giovanni Guasconti, a young student recently arrived from Naples, Southern Italy, to study at the University of Padua, is renting a room in an ancient building that still exhibits the Coat of Arms of the once-great, long since extinct Scrovegni family. Giovanni has studied Dante Alighieri's Divine Comedy and remembers that an ancestor of the Scrovegni, Reginaldo degli Scrovegni, appears in Dante's Hell, as a usurer and a sinner against Nature and Art (Canto XVII:64-75).

From his quarters, Giovanni looks at Beatrice, the beautiful daughter of Dr. Giacomo Rappaccini, a botanist who works in isolation. Beatrice is confined to the lush and locked gardens, which are filled with exotic poisonous plants grown by her father.

Having fallen in love, Giovanni enters the garden and secretly meets with Beatrice a number of times, while ignoring his mentor, Professor Pietro Baglioni, who is a rival of Dr. Rappaccini and warns Giovanni that Rappaccini is devious and that he and his work should be avoided.

Giovanni notices Beatrice's strangely intimate relationship with the plants as well as the withering of fresh regular flowers and the death of an insect when exposed to her skin or breath. On one occasion, Beatrice embraces a plant in a way that she seems part of the plant itself; then she talks to the plant, "Give me thy breath, my sister, for I am faint with common air."

Giovanni eventually realises that Beatrice, having been raised in the presence of poison, has developed an immunity and has become poisonous herself. A gentle touch of her hand leaves a purple print on his wrist. Beatrice urges Giovanni to look past her poisonous exterior and see her pure and innocent essence, creating great feelings of doubt and confusion in Giovanni.

In the end, Giovanni becomes poisonous himself: insects die when they come into contact with his breath. Giovanni is troubled by this, which he sees as a curse, and he blames Beatrice.

Professor Baglioni gives him an antidote to cure Beatrice and free her from her father's cruel experiment. However, when Beatrice drinks the antidote, she becomes sick and dies.

Before realising that Beatrice is dying, Dr. Rappaccini excitedly welcomes the love between his two creatures, his daughter and her suitor, Giovanni, who has been transformed so that he can now be a true and worthy companion to Beatrice.

While Beatrice is dying, Professor Baglioni looks down from a window into the garden and triumphantly shouts "Rappaccini! Rappaccini! and is THIS the upshot of your experiment!"

Interpretations

The story has parallels with that of Adam and Eve in the Book of Genesis, possibly with Dr. Rappaccini representing God (or a man playing God), Beatrice and Giovanni respectively representing Adam and Eve (with reversed gender roles) and Professor Baglioni representing Satan (or, alternatively, God). It is relevant to note that Giovanni/Eve offers Beatrice/Adam the antidote, suggesting that both should drink of it, but only Beatrice/Adam does so. The story would then represent the fall from grace, the expulsion from the Garden of Eden, and the introduction of the original sin.

According to one possible interpretation, the moral of the story is that mortals should not attempt to play God: Beatrice dies for the sins of her father, Dr. Rappaccini, whose experiments aimed at interfering with the laws of Nature. According to an opposite interpretation, Giovanni is not able to accept the gift that Beatrice brings, and her uniqueness: in the attempt to make her normal, he loses her and her love.

Genre

Rappaccini's Daughter is a Gothic story.

Beatrice is socially and physically isolated from the rest of the world. Due to supernatural causes or due to Dr Rappaccini's mysterious scientific experiments, she seems to belong to the garden only, a flower among flowers: she lives a happy life until she meets Giovanni, with whom she falls in love. How Beatrice becomes poisonous remains without logical explanation. Although she is innocent and pure, Giovanni is convinced that she is corrupted or cursed by her poisonousness, and that she needs to be saved. Although in distress, Beatrice accepts to drink the antidote for the sake of Giovanni and dies like the heroine of a tragic romance.

Dr. Rappaccini remains a mysterious character, described only by his rival/enemy Professor Baglioni. Dr. Rappaccini is represented as a Faustian/diabolical figure, unnaturally ambitious and with cruel hidden motivations. Only at the end his intentions are revealed: he created the garden for his daughter and her future suitor, hoping to place them above all other creatures, just like God had created the Garden of Eden for Adam and Eve.

The end of the story leaves the reader shocked and filled with horror as well as confused about the ambiguity in meaning and moral of the story.

Further Gothic elements are the theme of morality, the great deal of symbolism, the description of strong emotions (love, jealousy, ambition), the setting in a distant past, in a place with a possibly dark history.

Sources

The name of Rappaccini's daughter is a reference to Dante's Beatrice, allegory of Divine Wisdom and Divine Grace: the name means "she who brings bliss", "she who makes blessed". Dante meets her in the Garden of Eden, while a hundred angels scatter flowers above and around her (Purgatory Canto XXX:19–39).

According to Octavio Paz, the sources of Hawthorne's story lie in Ancient India. In the play Mudrarakshasa, one of two political rivals employs the gift of a visha kanya, a beautiful girl who is fed on poison. This theme of a woman transformed into a phial of venom is popular in Indian literature and appears in the Puranas. From India, the story passed to the West and contributed to the Gesta Romanorum, among other texts. In the 17th century, Robert Burton picked up the tale in The Anatomy of Melancholy and gave it a historical character: the Indian king Porus sends Alexander the Great a girl brimming with poison.

In Hawthorne's story, the character Pietro Baglioni draws a parallel between Beatrice's fate and an old story of a poisonous Indian girl presented to Alexander, a tale that appears to be based on the Burton/Browne story. Also, the University of Padua is famed for its vast botanical garden, which was founded in 1545. But whether the garden actually influenced Hawthorne in writing "Rappaccini's Daughter" is not known.

It is also possible that Hawthorne was inspired by the character Elizabeth's grotesque revenge in the 1833 novel The Down-Easters by fellow New Englander John Neal. The two authors first connected when Neal's magazine The Yankee published the first substantial praise of Hawthorne's work in 1828.

Style
Hawthorne begins the story with reference to the writings of the fictional writer 'Monsieur Aubépine', named after the French name of the hawthorn plant. He both praises and criticizes the author's style and intent. This introduction aims to establish a tone of uncertainty and confusion, throwing off expectations and establishing the theme of the interrelationship of perception, reality and fantasy. He lists texts by M. de l'Aubépine, some of which translate into Hawthorne's own works as follows:
 Contes deux fois racontés is Twice-Told Tales.
 Le Voyage céleste à chemin de fer is The Celestial Railroad.
 Le Nouveau Père Adam et la Nouvelle Mère Eve is The New Adam and Eve.
 Rodéric ou le Serpent à l'estomac is Egotism; or, The Bosom-Serpent.
 Le Culte de feu is Fire Worship.
 "L'Artiste du beau" is "The Artist of the Beautiful or the Mechanical Butterfly."

The narrator says the text was translated from Beatrice ou la Belle Empoisonneuse which translates to "Beatrice or the Beautiful Poisoner" and was published in "La Revue Anti-Aristocratique" ("The Anti-Aristocratic Review").

Adaptations

Operas
 Rappaccini's Daughter by Charles Wakefield Cadman premiered at Carnegie Hall on March 20, 1925
 Rappaccini's Daughter by Margaret Garwood (1983)
 La hija de Rappaccini by Daniel Catán (1991)
 The Poisoned Kiss by Ralph Vaughan Williams
 Rappaccini's Daughter by Michael Cohen (2000)
 Rappaccini's Daughter Opera in Three Acts by Avrohom Leichtling (1967–68)

Plays

 Spanish-language play: La Hija de Rappaccini by Octavio Paz (1956)
 English-language play: Rappaccini's Daughter by Sebastian Doggart (1996)

Poetry
 John Todhunter verse-play The Poison-Flower, A Phantasy, in Three Scenes (1891)

Radio
 NBC's The Weird Circle (1943–1947), Episode 52, Radio Play. Broadcast date: November 26, 1944
 CBC's "Vanishing Point" (1984–1986), 3rd episode of the "Thrice Told Tales" sub-series. Broadcast date: December 1, 1986

Television
 Lights Out, featuring the first screen appearance of Eli Wallach
 PBS's American Short Story, starring Kristoffer Tabori, Kathleen Beller, Madeline Willemsen and Leonardo Cimino (1980)

Film
 Twice Told Tales, starring Vincent Price (1963)

References

Sources
 Latin American Plays, "Rappaccini's Daughter, by Octavio Paz". Sebastian Doggart, editor. Nick Hern Books, 1996.

External links

 Hawthorne, Nathaniel, 1804–1864 . Rappaccini's Daughter Electronic Text Center, University of Virginia Library
 Literary Criticism at VCU
 Audio at voanews.com
 

1844 short stories
Short stories adapted into films
Short stories by Nathaniel Hawthorne
Works adapted into operas
Works set in the 16th century
Italy in fiction